Tonglen (or tonglen) is Tibetan for 'giving and taking' (or sending and receiving), and refers to a meditation practice found in Tibetan Buddhism.

Tong means "giving or sending", and len means "receiving or taking".  Tonglen is also known as exchanging self with other. It's the seventh slogan, under Relative Bodhicitta, in Lojong. And is aspirational Bodhicitta precepts training in the Longchen Nyingthig Ngöndro, to see others as equal to self by exchanging self and other, where applying Bodhicitta begins with giving.

Practice

In the practice, one exchanges the self with other, sending and taking should be practiced alternately. These two should ride the breath. As such it is a training in altruism.

The function of the practice is to:
 reduce selfish attachment
 increase a sense of renunciation
 purify karma by giving and helping
 develop and expand loving-kindness and bodhicitta

The practice of Tonglen involves all of the Six Perfections; giving, ethics, patience, joyous effort, concentration and wisdom. These are the practices of a Bodhisattva.

Practical aspects on this meditation

Patrul Rinpoche (1808–1887), a prominent teacher and author from the Nyingma school of Tibetan Buddhism gives the practice as starting on breathing out, with imagining giving (sending) happiness and the best.  Then as breathing in, imagine taking (receiving) in the sufferings.   

Pema Chödrön, an American Tibetan Buddhist nun in the Shambhala Buddhism tradition (2000), says Tonglen can start on the inhale and gives the instruction as follows:

The intention of this practice is to work with habitual patterns of mind and "develop the psychological attitude of exchanging oneself for others," as Chogyam Trungpa Rinpoche writes in Training the Mind and Cultivating Kindness. 

Taking onto oneself the suffering of others and giving happiness and success to all sentient beings seems a heavy task, especially for a beginner in the practice. It might be appropriate to start out with smaller issues, like working with oneself to increase one's own well-being, increasing harmony in the family, open one's own mind to communicate better with other people or just finding more peace in doing the necessary daily chores. This is an area where it might be easier to experience some success in order to be able to go on with taking on the unhappiness or conflicts among other people, even though the principal aim is to develop one's own selfless and empathic qualities more than or at least as much as creating a real difference for others. The principle of taking in the suffering or disharmony on the in-breath and spreading an antidote of joy, harmony or peace of mind (or whatever might be needed in the specific case) on the out-breath is the same as described above. It is also a good option to use a small pause after the in-breath to convert the suffering or disharmony to the positive antidote which is to be breathed out.

Taking on suffering does not really mean to burden oneself with the misery of the world, but rather to acknowledge its existence and accept it. This makes it possible to increase one's own peace of mind at the same time as taking suffering or disharmony in, so there is less contradiction than there might seem to be.

History

This practice is summarized in seven points, which are attributed to the great Indian Buddhist teacher Atisha Dipankara Shrijnana, born in 982 CE.  They were first written down by Kadampa master Langri Tangpa (1054–1123). The practice became more widely known when Geshe Chekawa Yeshe Dorje (1101–1175) summarized the points in his Seven Points of Training the Mind. This list of mind training (lojong) aphorisms or 'slogans' compiled by Chekawa is often referred to as the Atisha Slogans.

See also
Lojong
Mettā - an associated practice
Buddhist meditation

References

Further reading
Kamalashila (1996). Meditation: The Buddhist Art of Tranquility and Insight. Birmingham: Windhorse Publications. .
Trungpa, Chogyam. Training the Mind and Cultivating Loving-Kindness. Shambhala Classics. 
H.H. The Dalai Lama. The Path To Tranquility: Daily Meditations. Viking Adult, 1999. .
Chödrön, Pema. Tonglen: The Path of Transformation. Vajradhatu Publications, 2000.
Chödrön, Pema. Comfortable With Uncertainty. Shambhala Publications, 2003. .

Audio
Chödrön, Pema. Good Medicine: How to Turn Pain into Compassion With Tonglen Meditation. Sounds True, Inc, 2001. .

External links
 Pema teaches Tonglen in these videos.

Tibetan Buddhist meditation
Tibetan words and phrases